Krasinsky is a rural locality (a khutor) in Solontsovskoye Rural Settlement, Alexeyevsky District, Volgograd Oblast, Russia. The population was 42 as of 2010.

Geography 
Krasinsky is located 25 km southeast of Alexeyevskaya (the district's administrative centre) by road. Solontsovsky is the nearest rural locality.

References 

Rural localities in Alexeyevsky District, Volgograd Oblast